Piz Fliana is a mountain of the Silvretta Alps, located south of Piz Buin in the Swiss canton of Graubünden.

References

External links
 Piz Fliana on Hikr

Mountains of Switzerland
Mountains of Graubünden
Mountains of the Alps
Alpine three-thousanders
Silvretta Alps
Scuol
Zernez